Eucalyptus megasepala is a species of medium-sized tree that is endemic to Far North Queensland and Cape York Peninsula. It has rough, fibrous or stringy bark from the trunk to the smaller branches, lance-shaped or curved adult leaves, flower buds in groups of three, white flowers and cup-shaped to cylindrical fruit.

Description
The bark on the trunk and branches is greyish brown, fibrous or stringy, and furrowed. Flowering occurs between April and July and the flowers are white or creamy-white.

Taxonomy and naming
Eucalyptus megasepala was first formally described in 2006 by Anthony Bean and the description was published in the journal Austrobaileya from a specimen collected near Jowalbinna (near Laura). According to Bean, the specific epithet (megasepala) is derived from the Greek mega (large) and sepalum (sepal), referring to the size of the sepals of this species compared to those of the related E. tetrodonta. Sepalum is however New Latin.

Distribution and habitat
This eucalypt grows in open woodland on sandstone hills between the Iron Range on Cape York to Irvinebank and Mount Mulgrave in Far North Queensland.

Conservation status
This eucalypt is classified as "least concern" under the Queensland Government Nature Conservation Act 1992.

See also
List of Eucalyptus species

References

megasepala
Myrtales of Australia
Flora of Queensland
Plants described in 2006